Ross W. Atkinson (1945 – March 8, 2006) was an American librarian and scholar.

Atkinson worked at Northwestern University from 1977 until 1983 when he left to become an assistant university librarian for collection development at the University of Iowa. In 1988, he moved to Cornell University where he was an associate librarian for collections until his death.

Atkinson was named the 2003 Academic/Research Librarian of the Year by the Association of College and Research Libraries (ACRL), a division of the American Library Association (ALA). The "Ross Atkinson Lifetime Achievement Award" was established in 2007 by the Association for Library Collections and Technical Services (ALCTS), another division of the ALA.

References

Literature
 Alan, Robert; MacEwan, Bonnie (2005), Community, Collaboration, and Collections: The Writings of Ross Atkinson, 

American librarians
1945 births
2006 deaths